Spišské Bystré, known officially until 1948 as Kubachy is a large village and municipality of the Poprad District in the Prešov Region of northern Slovakia.

History
In historical records, the village was first mentioned in 1294.

Geography
The municipality lies at an elevation of 674 metres (2,211 ft) and covers an area of 38.031 km2 (14.684 mi2). It has a population of approximately 2,400 people.

Economy and Infrastructure
Spišské Bystré has a football club which was established in 1934, OFK 1934 SPIŠSKÉ BYSTRÉ. In the nearby locality, Kubašok, there is touristic infrastructure which comprises a ski-lift and a couple of cottages. One of the major cultural sights is the Roman Catholic neo-gothic church of St. Michal which was rebuilt in 1926 after a fire destroyed the original building. It is located on the main square of the village on Michalská street.
The local church is exceptional because of one world rarity - on the walls is the Way of the Cross, which depicts other scenes, such as those described in the Bible and officially presented in the Catholic Church, or the scenes are assigned to different Stations numbers.

Notable Personalities
Eliáš Mlynarovich, writer
Peter Stašák, singer
Plk. F/Lt Franišek Chmura (born 17.8.1919), pilot, member of RAF forces during WWII
Pplk. F/Sgt Andrej Lopúch (born 12.7.19130), radio officer, shooter, member of RAF forces during WWII

References

External links
 
 
http://spisskebystre.e-obce.sk

Villages and municipalities in Poprad District
Spiš